Ronald Guy de Alwis (February 15, 1959 - January 12, 2013) was a Sri Lankan cricketer who played in 11 Tests and 31 ODIs from 1983 to 1988.

De Alwis was married to Sri Lankan Women's cricketer Rasanjali Silva.

International awards

One-Day International Cricket

Man of the Match awards

References

1959 births
2013 deaths
Sinhalese Sports Club cricketers
Sri Lanka One Day International cricketers
Sri Lanka Test cricketers
Sri Lankan cricketers
Alumni of S. Thomas' College, Mount Lavinia
Wicket-keepers